Arica Province is one of two provinces of Chile's northernmost region, Arica y Parinacota. The province is bordered on the north by the Tacna Province of Peru, on the south by the Tamarugal Province in the Tarapacá Region, on the east the Parinacota Province and on the west by the Pacific Ocean. Its capital is the port city of Arica.

History
Founded as Villa de San Marcos de Arica in 1541 on the site of a pre-Columbian settlement, it belonged to Peru until 1879, when it was captured by the Chileans, who gained control of the locality under the Treaty of Ancón (1883)

Geography and demography
Between the 1992 and 2002 censuses, the population grew by 9.5% (16,184 persons).

Administration
As a province, Arica is a second-level administrative division of Chile, consisting of two communes (comunas): Arica in the northern portion and Camarones in the south. The coastal city of Arica serves as the provincial capital. The province is administered by the presidentially appointed regional delegate of Arica y Parinacota.

References

External links 

 
 Municipality of Arica

Provinces of Arica y Parinacota Region
Provinces of Chile